Statistics of the Swedish football Division 2 in the 1971 season.

League standings

Norrland

Svealand

Norra Götaland

Södra Götaland

Allsvenskan promotion playoffs

Footnotes

References
Sweden - List of final tables (Clas Glenning)

Swedish Football Division 2 seasons
2
Sweden
Sweden